This is a list of episodes for Fast N' Loud Season 9. Season 9 started on September 7, 2015.

Special episodes 
"Fast N' Loud: Revved Up: Pebble Beach, Motorcycle Mayhem, and Auction Fever",

References 

2015 American television seasons